Bulgaria competed at the 1936 Summer Olympics in Berlin, Germany.  The nation returned to the Olympic Games after having missed the 1932 Summer Olympics due to high travel costs. 26 competitors, all men, took part in 22 events in 7 sports.

Athletics

 Track and Road Events

Combined Events - Decathlon

Cycling

Ten cyclists, all male, represented Bulgaria in 1936.

 Road Cycling

 Track Cycling

Sprint

Equestrian

At the 1936 Summer Olympics Bulgaria participated with three competitors only in the Three-Day-Event as at the time the Eventing discipline of Equestrian Sports was a military sports competition, meaning that only military people could participate in it and the Bulgarian military had earned Olympic quotas.

 Three-Day-Event (Military)
 Individual

 Team

Fencing

One male fencer represented Bulgaria in 1936 - Dimitar Vasilev.

Fencing Events

Gymnastics

At the 1936 Summer Olympics the members of the Bulgarian Gymnastics Men's Team participated in all the Gymnastics Events to be eligible for the team ranking.

 Individual

 Team

Shooting

Men

Art competitions

References

External links
Official Olympic Reports

Nations at the 1936 Summer Olympics
1936
1936 in Bulgarian sport